Neuville-lez-Beaulieu is a commune in the Ardennes department and Grand Est region of north-eastern France.

Geography
The Sormonne flows through the commune and forms part of its eastern border.

Population

See also
Communes of the Ardennes department

References

Communes of Ardennes (department)
Ardennes communes articles needing translation from French Wikipedia